Titanio heliothalis is a moth in the family Crambidae. It was described by Staudinger in 1892. It is found in Central Asia, where it has been recorded from the Alay Mountains.

References

Moths described in 1892
Odontiini
Taxa named by Otto Staudinger